The 1985 Lilian Cup was the 4th season of the competition. The four top placed teams for the previous season took part in the competition.

The competition was held in two stages. First, the four teams played a round-robin tournament, after which the two top teams played for the cup, while the bottom teams played for the third place. The competition was held between 31 August and 10 September 1985.
 
The competition was won by Beitar Jerusalem, who had beaten Maccabi Petah Tikva 3–1 in the final.

Group stage
The matches were played from 31 August to 7 September 1985.

Final stage

3rd-4th Place Match

Final

References

Lilian 1985
Lilian Cup